Boxing Helena is a 1993 American mystery thriller and body horror film directed by Jennifer Lynch and starring Sherilyn Fenn, Julian Sands, and Bill Paxton. Before its release, the film's production was hampered by legal battles with Madonna and Kim Basinger, who both backed out of playing Helena. The film debuted at the Sundance Film Festival in January 1993, where it was both dismissed and praised in equal measure by critics. After receiving an NC-17 rating from the MPAA, the film was given an R rating on appeal and released in the United States in September 1993. It was a critical and financial failure.

Plot
The movie follows a surgeon whose growing obsession with a woman leads him to hold her captive in his home after she suffers a car accident and to amputate her limbs to keep her captive.

Nick Cavanaugh is a lonely Atlanta surgeon obsessed with Helena, with whom he had one intimate experience, but she disdains him. After she suffers a high-grade tibial fracture in a hit-and-run motor vehicle collision in front of his home, Nick kidnaps Helena and surreptitiously treats her in his home, amputating both her legs above the knee. Later, after she tries to choke him, Nick amputates her arms above the elbow.

Though Helena is the victim of Nick's kidnapping and mutilation, she dominates the dialogue with constant ridicule of his shortcomings. But this was all a dream: Helena awakes in the hospital with all her limbs intact.

Cast
 Sherilyn Fenn as Helena
 Julian Sands as Nick Cavanaugh
 Bill Paxton as Ray O'Malley
 Kurtwood Smith as Alan Palmer
 Art Garfunkel as Lawrence Augustine
 Betsy Clark as Anne Garrett
 Nicolette Scorsese as Fantasy Lover/Nurse
 Meg Register as Marion Cavanaugh
 Bryan Smith as Russell
 Marla Levine as Patricia
 Kim Lentz as Nurse Diane
 Lloyd T. Williams as Sam the Clerk

Production
Producer Philippe Caland came up with the idea, but wanted a woman to write it, and so approached Lynch after she gave a poetry reading. At first, Lynch declined to get involved, reportedly telling him "Well, that sounds kind of terrible." But Caland was eventually able to convince her to work on it. In writing, Lynch was inspired by some elements from her own childhood, telling Vice that being born with club feet, and her grandmother owning a Venus de Milo replica, influenced her insight into the characters:

It always struck me the way people looked at the Venus. They didn't see her as broken, they saw her as beautiful. And it really made a huge impact on me. I thought I was broken and that maybe someday someone would find me beautiful. So this idea of a damaged boy who was in an obsessive situation who would try to recreate from his own view the one thing that didn't hit him or abandon him was this armless, beautiful woman. And therefore in a dream recreate this obsessive thing where we take from one another until we are the size and shape that we think the other person should be for us.

Madonna was slated to play Helena, but shortly before filming was to begin in January 1991 she dropped out, halting the production. The next month, in an attempt to salvage the film, Lynch met with Kim Basinger about playing Helena. Basinger agreed, but closer to the new filming date she began requesting what The New York Times called "major script revisions", which according to producer Mazzocone amounted to making Helena "less of a bitch". After the production failed to make the changes to Basinger's satisfaction she also quit the picture.

Legal battles involving both stars then ensued. Eventually Basinger was the subject of an adverse jury verdict for over $8.1 million, which bankrupted her. The verdict was set aside on appeal in 1994, but Basinger later settled for $3.8 million.

Meanwhile, Fenn, who had previously worked with Lynch's father on Twin Peaks, was cast as Helena in December 1991. By this time a third major star, Ed Harris, had also backed out of the film due to the ever-increasing delays, telling The New York Times, "I needed to get on with my life."

Music
The score heard during the scene where Helena showers in a fountain while a party crowd watches was originally composed by Graeme Revell and based on the "Love Theme" used sparsely elsewhere in the film, with vocals by Bobbi Page. At the producers' request, "The Fountain Song", written and performed by Wendy Levy, replaced Revell's score in the DVD and subsequent releases.

Release
Boxing Helena premiered at the Sundance Film Festival in January 1993 and was theatrically released by Orion Classics in the United States on September 3, 1993, Entertainment Film Distributors in the United Kingdom on June 18, 1993, and Republic Pictures in other international territories.

Box office
The film performed poorly at the box office, grossing $1,796,389 in the domestic box office.

Reception
The film received negative reviews from critics upon release and was widely considered to be of poor quality, despite garnering praise at Sundance. On the review aggregator website Rotten Tomatoes, the film has a 17% score based on 36 reviews, with an average rating of 3.8/10. The website's consensus reads, "A disturbing concept marred by graceless execution, Boxing Helena is a psychosexual drama that proves more tedious than provocative." Metacritic reports a 26 out of 100 rating based on 14 critics, indicating "generally unfavorable reviews". Chicago Tribune critic Gene Siskel was one of the few positive notices, giving the film three out of four stars. John Simon of the National Review called Boxing Helena "the rottenest apple from the bottom of the cinematic barrel".

Nominations and awards
The film was nominated for the Grand Jury Prize at the 1993 Sundance Film Festival. Lynch "won" a Golden Raspberry Award for Worst Director at the 14th Golden Raspberry Awards in 1994.

In popular culture 
The film was referenced in the television series Gilmore Girls (S3:E7 “They Shoot Gilmores, Don’t They?”), as well as The Nanny (S1:E22 "I Don't Remember Mama"). The film also inspired the song "Helena" by Misfits from their album Famous Monsters and "Helena 2" from their album Cuts from the Crypt.

The film's title was used as the name of an episode of the sixth season of The Fresh Prince of Bel-Air, when Will Smith's character takes boxing lessons from an attractive instructor named Helena.

The fifth season finale of Daria, "Boxing Daria," takes inspiration from the film's title.

See also
 List of American films of 1993
 Amputee fetishism

References

External links
 
 
 
 
 Boxing Helena, A Film Review by James Berardinelli

1993 films
1993 independent films
1990s mystery thriller films
1993 romantic drama films
1990s thriller drama films
American independent films
American mystery drama films
American romantic drama films
American mystery thriller films
Films scored by Graeme Revell
Films about kidnapping
Films about amputees
Films about dreams
Films directed by Jennifer Chambers Lynch
Films shot in Atlanta
Films shot in Georgia (U.S. state)
Films shot in Los Angeles
1990s romantic thriller films
Republic Pictures films
Orion Pictures films
American romantic thriller films
1993 directorial debut films
Golden Raspberry Award winning films
1990s English-language films
1990s American films